Island Lake is a summer village in Alberta, Canada. It is located on the western shore of Island Lake, along Highway 2, northwest of Athabasca.

Demographics 

In the 2016 Census of Population conducted by Statistics Canada, the Summer Village of Island Lake had a population of 228 living in 96 of its 263 total private dwellings, a  change from its 2011 population of 243.

See also 
List of communities in Alberta
List of summer villages in Alberta
List of resort villages in Saskatchewan

References

External links 

1983 establishments in Alberta
Summer villages in Alberta